Ruth Elizabeth Jones McClendon (5 October 1943 – 19 December 2017) was an American politician.

McClendon was born in Houston on 5 October 1943, and graduated from Phillis Wheatley High School before attending Texas Southern University as an undergraduate and earning a master's degree from Webster University.

She originally contested the open seat of Lou Nelle Sutton in 1988, but lost District 120 of the Texas House of Representatives to Karyne Jones Conley. Between June 1993 and August 1996, McClendon was a member of the San Antonio City Council from District 2. After Conley resigned her state legislative seat in July 1996, McClendon won a special election and was seated on 12 November 1996, succeeding a fellow Democrat and African-American in office. In all subsequent legislative elections, McClendon won no less than 85% of the vote.

She resigned from the state legislature on 31 January 2016, and died in San Antonio of brain cancer on 19 December 2017.

References

20th-century African-American women
21st-century African-American women
1943 births
2017 deaths
San Antonio City Council members
African-American city council members in Texas
African-American city council members
African-American women in politics
Deaths from brain cancer in the United States
Politicians from San Antonio
20th-century African-American politicians
20th-century American politicians
20th-century American women politicians
African-American state legislators in Texas
Women state legislators in Texas
Deaths from cancer in Texas
21st-century African-American politicians
21st-century American politicians
Texas Democrats
Politicians from Houston
Webster University alumni
Texas Southern University alumni
21st-century American women politicians